Thomas Michael J Brock (born November 1994) is an English former first-class cricketer.

Early life and career 
Brock was born at Yeovil in November 1994. He was educated at Millfield before going up St Hilda's College, Oxford. While studying at Oxford, he made a single appearance in first-class cricket for Oxford University against Cambridge University at Fenner's in the 2017 University Match, taking figures of 3 for 61 in the Cambridge first-innings and 3 for 76 in their second-innings.

References

External links

1994 births
Living people
People from Yeovil
People educated at Millfield
Alumni of St Hilda's College, Oxford
English cricketers
Oxford University cricketers